Amirabad (also Romanized as Amīrābād) is a village in Vardasht Rural District, in the Central District of Semirom County, Isfahan Province, Iran. At the 2016 census, its population was 14, in 5 families.

References 

Populated places in Semirom County